Fred Tissot (born 14 July 1995) is a Tahitian footballer who plays as a striker for A.S. Central Sport in the Tahiti Ligue 1.

References

1995 births
Living people
French Polynesian footballers
Association football forwards
Tahiti international footballers
2016 OFC Nations Cup players